The 2021–22 season is the 102nd season of Sporting Club East Bengal (EB or SCEB) and their second season in the Indian Super League. Due to the COVID-19 pandemic, the 2021–22 Indian Super League season is set to begin on 19 November 2021 and is scheduled to end on 20 March 2022 with all the matches to be held in Goa across three venues just like the previous season.

Background 

The 2021-22 season is once again set to be played entirely in Goa due to COVID-19 pandemic. The league committee also announced that the number of foreign players that can be registered and fielded is to be reduced, with four foreign players in the playing eleven and a maximum of six can be registered, one of which should be from an Asian nation.

On 8 June, East Bengal Club was handed a transfer ban by FIFA for non-payment of dues for former player Johnny Acosta. The club was also uncertain to participate in the 2020–21 season of Indian Super League as the row between the club and their prime investor group was yet to resolve which threatened their participation in any footballing activity for the season. The AIFF and the FSDL had asked the club authorities to sort out the mess between the club and the investor group soon. East Bengal coach Robbie Fowler too expressed his dissatisfaction over the issue and slammed the club officials for their delay in signing the final termsheet. On 25 June, the club announced that they have cleared off the dues for Johnny Acosta and hence expect the transfer ban to be uplifted by  FIFA soon. On 5 July, FIFA officially uplifted the transfer ban on East Bengal, however, the club was on the verge of facing another transfer ban due to non-payment of dues for three more former players: Rakshit Dagar, Pintu Mahata and Abhash Thapa. On 6 August, The All India Football Federation handed another transfer ban to East Bengal due to the non-payment of dues for the three aforementioned players. On 26 August, the transfer ban was lifted by the AIFF after SC East Bengal cleared the dues for the three players. 

Due to the tussle between the club and the investor group, East Bengal lost out on a few of their star performers from last season including Bright Enobakhare, Debjit Majumder, Sarthak Golui, Narayan Das and Matti Steinmann. The fans put up a huge protest in front of the club premises on 21 July demanding an immediate solution for the situation. On 25 August, the long-running tussle between the club and the investor group finally came to a solution after a mediatory intervention by the Chief minister of West Bengal Mamata Banerjee, and it was announced that the club will be participating in the 2021–22 Indian Super League with Shree Cement staying on as the investors.

Transfers

Incoming

Loan in

Outgoing

Team

First-team squad

New contracts

Coaching staff 

On 8 September, East Bengal announced that the club has mutually terminated the contract with coach Robbie Fowler, and announced the arrival of former Real Madrid Castilla coach Manolo Díaz as the new head coach for the season. East Bengal also appointed former Real Madrid coach Angel Puebla Garcia as the assistant coach. He will also be fulfilling the responsibilities of a strength and fitness coach. The club also announced that Renedy Singh will be continuing his role as the assistant coach. East Bengal appointed Malaysian fitness coach Joseph Ronald D'Angelus as the head of sport science, and former Chelsea and Crystal Palace coach Leslie Cleevely as the goalkeeping coach for the season. On 28 September, East Bengal announced the signing of former head-coach Mridul Banerjee as the team manager. On 11 November, East Bengal announced that they have parted ways with Joseph Ronald D'Angelus due to some personal reasons.

On 28 December, East Bengal announced that they have parted ways with head coach Manolo Díaz and assistant Angel Puebla Garcia after they failed to win even one game in their eight-match tenure. Renedy Singh has been appointed as the interim head coach of the team. On 1 January, East Bengal announced that former head coach Mario Rivera Campesino has been appointed as the new head coach for the season. On 16 January, East Bengal announced that goalkeeper coach Les Cleevely would leave his position and return home due to personal reasons and he would be replaced by Mihir Sawant. On 6 February, East Bengal announced the appointment of Victor Herrero Forcada as the assistant coach for the remainder of the season.

Kit 
East Bengal launched its kits for the season on 6 November 2021. The traditional red and gold fields, vertically split into two halves returned after four seasons as the home kit. The away kit is white with red and gold trim on the collar, sleeves, and bottom of the shirt. The third kit is an evolution of last season's away kit, paying tribute to Bengal's love for fish and East Bengal's connection with Ilish (Hilsa).

Pre-season
East Bengal started their squad building for the new season late, only after the settlement between the club and the investor group on 25 August. Hira Mondal became the first recruit of the window from Mohammedan Sporting. On 29 August, the club signed the former India U-17 captain Amarjit Singh Kiyam on a season-long loan from Goa. The club also roped in young left-back Sarineo Fernandes from Goa and Sourav Das from Mumbai City on a permanent transfer. On 31 August, the deadline day, East Bengal signed a handful of players: Songpu Singsit from Neroca, Romeo Fernandes from Goa, Joyner Lourenco from Jamshedpur, Thongkhosiem Haokip from Bengaluru, Daniel Gomes from Salgaocar, Subha Ghosh and Naorem Mahesh Singh on loan from Kerala Blasters, Jackichand Singh on loan from Mumbai City, and Adil Khan on loan from Hyderabad. On 6 September, East Bengal announced the signing of 2020-21 Indian Super League golden gloves winning goalkeeper Arindam Bhattacharya in a free-transfer from ATK Mohun Bagan.

On 11 September, East Bengal announced their first foreign signing of the season as they roped in Slovenian midfielder Amir Dervišević from NK Maribor on a free transfer. East Bengal also roped in former Perth Glory defender Tomislav Mrcela, former Lazio defender Franjo Prce, Nigerian forward Daniel Chima Chukwu, former Ajax under–19 captain Darren Sidoel, and Croatian forward Antonio Perošević as the foreign signings for the season.

The East Bengal team and staff reached Goa on 29–30 September and after spending a mandatory quarantine of seven days in the team hotel, the team started their pre-season training. East Bengal will be playing few friendly matches against other Indian Super League teams as a part of their pre-season preparation ahead of the Indian Super League campaign. On 14 October, East Bengal announced two pre-season friendly matches against Goa Professional League teams: Vasco and Salgaocar on 15 and 16 October at the Don Bosco Ground in Fatorda. In the first pre-season match against Vasco, East Bengal won 3–1 with Thongkhosiem Haokip, Subha Ghosh and Siddhant Shirodkar scoring the team. In the second match against Salgaocar, East Bengal won 2–0 with midfielders Amir Dervišević and Sourav Das scoring for the team. In the third pre-season game on 20 October, East Bengal defeated the reigning I-League champions Gokulam Kerala 2–1 with goals from Balwant Singh and Wahengbam Angousana. On 13 November, East Bengal announced their veteran goalkeeper Arindam Bhattacharya as the captain and Croatian defender Tomislav Mrcela as the vice-captain for the season. On 14 November, East Bengal faced 2020–21 Indian Super League champions Mumbai City in their fourth pre-season friendly and held the defending champions to a 1–1 draw. Cassinho scored for Mumbai in the first half while Sourav Das scored the equaliser for East Bengal in the second half.

Pre-season friendlies

Competitions

Overall

Overview

Calcutta Football League

Summary 
On 1 July 2021, the Indian Football Association announced that the 2021–22 Calcutta Premier Division will be held in mid-August, without any spectators, adhering to all the protocols due to the COVID-19 pandemic. The committee has also announced that there will be a change in the format of the tournament with 14 teams likely to be divided into two groups and the top 8 teams will reach the knockout stage and play each other in the quarter-finals. However, the participation of East Bengal club was uncertain due to the tussle between the club and the investor group. On 25 August, after the differences were put to a stop by the intervention of Mamata Banerjee, the club has expressed the willingness to participate in the Calcutta Football League.

The fixtures for the 2021–22 Calcutta Premier Division was officially announced on 1 August by the Indian Football Association. East Bengal was set to start their campaign on 31 August against Bhawanipore, however, the club informed the IFA about the unavailability of the team and the match was cancelled. On 6 September, the IFA released fresh schedule for East Bengal where they are supposed to face BSS Sporting Club on 7 September, however, East Bengal management has notified the IFA that the team is not available yet and they will not be participating in the tournament. The IFA decided to handover all the matches to the respective opponents as walkovers and East Bengal finished at the bottom of the group.

League table 
Group A

Fixtures & results

Indian Super League

Summary 
Due to the COVID-19 pandemic, the 2021–22 season will once again be held entirely in Goa under a secured bio-bubble. The club was allotted the Tilak Maidan Stadium as their home ground for the season. On 13 September, the fixtures for the first leg was announced.

East Bengal began their campaign against Jamshedpur at the Tilak Maidan Stadium on 21 November with a 1–1 draw, with Franjo Prce putting East Bengal ahead in the seventeenth minute only for Peter Hartley to equalise in the injury time of the first half to share points. East Bengal faced ATK Mohun Bagan FC next in the Kolkata Derby at the Tilak Maidan Stadium on 27 November and suffered a 0–3 defeat with three first-half goals from Roy Krishna, Manvir Singh and Liston Colaco. Coach Manolo Diaz admitted that there is a big gap in quality between the two teams. East Bengal faced Odisha next on 30 November at the Tilak Maidan and suffered a 6–4 defeat. Darren Sidoel had put East Bengal ahead in the 13th minute but Odisha rallied from behind with Héctor Rodas scoring twice and Javier Hernández scoring directly from the corner-kick to take a 3–1 lead at half time. Aridai Cabrera scored two more in the second half while Isak Vanlalruatfela scored another as Odisha scored six goals against East Bengal in consecutive matches. Thongkhosiem Haokip scored one and Daniel Chima Chukwu scored twice as East Bengal reduced the margin late in the game. East Bengal coach Manolo Diaz expressed his frustrations after the game as he claimed: "We don't have enough quality to play matches in the Indian Super League".

East Bengal faced Chennaiyin in their fourth match on 3 December and managed a 0–0 goalless draw against the two-time champions. Hira Mondal was adjudged the man-of-the-match for his excellent defensive display to secure one point for the team. On 7 December, East Bengal went down 3–4 against Goa at the Tilak Maidan Stadium. Antonio Perosevic scored a brace while Amir Dervisevic scored one for East Bengal while Alberto Noguera scored twice along with goals from Jorge Ortiz and an own-goal from Perosevic as East Bengal suffered their third defeat in five matches. East Bengal faced Kerala Blasters next on 12 December at the Tilak Maidan and drew 1–1. Australian defender Tomislav Mrcela put East Bengal ahead in the thirty-seventh minute of the game with a header from a long throw-in by Raju Gaikwad but Álvaro Vázquez equalised for Kerala just before the half-time as both teams shared points. On 17 December, East Bengal faced NorthEast United and succumbed to their fourth defeat as the Highlanders won 2–0 with two second-half goals from V.P. Suhair and Patrick Flottmann. Croatian forward Antonio Perosevic was given marching orders after he assaulted the referee in the dying minutes of the game. The Croatian was handed a five-match ban for the incident. East Bengal faced Hyderabad in their eighth match on 23 December at the GMC Athletic Stadium and managed to get another point after the match ended 1–1. Amir Dervisevic put East Bengal ahead in the 20th minute from a free-kick but Bartholomew Ogbeche restored parity in the 35th minute as both the teams shared the points.

On 4 January, East Bengal faced Bengaluru at the Bambolim Stadium and managed another 1–1 draw, led by interim head coach Renedy Singh. Thongkhosiem Haokip put East Bengal ahead in the 28th minute of the game with a header from a set piece by Wahengbam Angousana. Bengaluru equalised in the second half via an own goal from Sourav Das in the 55th minute as both teams shared points. East Bengal faced the defending champions Mumbai City next on 7 January at the Tilak Maidan Stadium and played out a goalless draw to end the first leg of the season without a single win. Renedy Singh, who was once again in charge of the team, applauded his injury-stricken side for the performance against the defending champions despite playing with just one foreign player. East Bengal faced Jamshedpur in the next match on 11 January and suffered another defeat as Ishan Pandita scored a late winner in the 88th minute to hand Jamshedpur a 1–0 win. Interim head coach Renedy Singh had fielded an all Indian starting eleven against Jamshedpur, a first of a kind in the history of the Indian Super League.

On 19 January, East Bengal faced Goa at the Bambolim Stadium and snatched their first victory of the season as they won 2–1 with Naorem Mahesh Singh scoring a brace for the team. Alberto Noguera scored the only goal for Goa. East Bengal thus ended their winless streak after 346 days, since their victory against Jamshedpur in the previous season. This was also the first game in charge for new head coach Mario Rivera. East Bengal faced Hyderabad next on 24 January at the Bambolim Stadium and suffered a 4–0 defeat. Bartholomew Ogbeche scored a hattrick while Aniket Jadhav scored the other as East Bengal suffered their sixth defeat of the season. On 29 January, East Bengal faced rivals ATK Mohun Bagan and suffered a 3–1 defeat after conceding two late goals in the injury time, as Kiyan Nassiri scored a hattrick for ATK Mohun Bagan after Darren Sidoel had put East Bengal ahead in the 56th minute.

On 2 February, East Bengal faced Chennaiyin at the Tilak Maidan and rallied from 0–2 behind to make a 2–2 comeback in the injury time. Chennaiyin took the lead in the second minute after Hira Mondal scored an own-goal and Ninthoinganba Meetei doubled the lead in the 15th minute. Darren Sidoel scored directly from a free-kick in the 61st minute for East Bengal to reduce the deficit while Lalrinliana Hnamte headed in the equaliser in the 91st minute to complete the comeback and earn another point for East Bengal.

League table

Result summary

Results by match

Matches 
The season fixtures for the first 10 matches were released on 13 September. East Bengal began their campaign against Jamshedpur on 21 November 2021. The second half of the fixtures were announced on 21 December.

Statistics

Appearances

Goal Scorers

Assists

Clean Sheets

Disciplinary Record

Club awards

ISL Fans' Goal of the Week award 
This is awarded weekly to the player chosen by fans voting at the Indian Super League website.

See also 
 2021–22 in Indian football

Notes

References

External links 

 Official website

East Bengal Club seasons
2021–22 Indian Super League season by team